Pacífico F.C. was a Colombian football (soccer) team, based in Buenaventura, Valle del Cauca, Colombia. The club was founded in 2010 and played in Categoría Primera B. The club was formerly known as Girardot F.C. based in Girardot, which then moved to Palmira becoming Deportes Palmira but due to financial difficulties, the club relocated to Buenaventura and was rebranded as Pacífico F.C. The club only lasted less than two years after it was moved again and became Sucre F.C.

Football clubs in Colombia
Association football clubs established in 2010
Categoría Primera B clubs